The Great Southern Football League (GSFL) is an Australian rules football competition based in the Fleurieu Peninsula region of South Australia, Australia.  It is an affiliated member of the South Australian National Football League and is zoned to the South Adelaide Football Club.

Brief History

Although football was played in the area in the 1870s, with the Goolwa club dating themselves from 1878, it was not until 1923 that the Great Southern Football Association was formed.  The founding clubs were Encounter Bay, Goolwa, Hindmarsh Valley, Port Elliot and Victor Harbour.

Since that time a number of clubs have formed part of the Association, which itself changed its name to the Great Southern Football League.  Current member clubs include Willunga, which is one of the oldest football clubs in South Australia, tracing its history back to 1874.

Current clubs

Notes

List of Premiers 
List of premiership teams of Great Southern Football League. 

 1923 VICTOR HARBOUR FC
 1924 VICTOR HARBOUR FC
 1925 GOOLWA FC
 1926 VICTOR HARBOUR FC
 1927 PORT ELLIOT FC
 1928 VICTOR HARBOUR FC
 1929 PORT ELLIOT FC
 1930 VICTOR HARBOUR FC
 1931 PORT ELLIOT FC
 1932 GOOLWA FC
 1933 PORT ELLIOT FC
 1934 VICTOR HARBOUR FC
 1935 PORT ELLIOT FC
 1936 PORT ELLIOT FC
 1937 PORT ELLIOT FC
 1938 PORT ELLIOT FC
 1939 PORT ELLIOT FC
 1940 ENCOUNTER BAY FC
 1946 VICTOR HARBOUR FC
 1947 VICTOR HARBOUR FC

 1948 VICTOR HARBOUR FC
 1949 VICTOR HARBOUR FC
 1950 VICTOR HARBOUR FC
 1951 VICTOR HARBOUR FC
 1952 VICTOR HARBOUR FC
 1953 GOOLWA FC
 1954 MOUNT COMPASS FC
 1955 VICTOR HARBOUR FC
 1956 BAY VALLEY ROVERS FC
 1957 VICTOR HARBOUR FC
 1958 ENCOUNTER BAY FC
 1959 MOUNT COMPASS FC
 1960 ENCOUNTER BAY FC
 1961 ENCOUNTER BAY FC
 1962 PORT ELLIOT FC
 1963 STRATHALBYN FC
 1964 STRATHALBYN FC
 1965 ENCOUNTER BAY FC
 1966 STRATHALBYN FC
 1967 ENCOUNTER BAY FC

 1968 STRATHALBYN FC
 1969 YANKALILLA FC
 1970 YANKALILLA FC
 1971 STRATHALBYN FC
 1972 VICTOR HARBOUR FC
 1973 PORT ELLIOT FC
 1974 MYPONGA FC
 1975 GOOLWA FC
 1976 GOOLWA FC
 1977 GOOLWA FC
 1978 LANGHORNE CREEK FC
 1979 STRATHALBYN FC
 1980 MOUNT COMPASS FC
 1981 STRATHALBYN FC
 1982 STRATHALBYN FC
 1983 MYPONGA FC
 1984 MYPONGA FC
 1985 YANKALILLA FC
 1986 WILLUNGA FC
 1987 STRATHALBYN FC

 1988 WILLUNGA FC
 1989 ENCOUNTER BAY FC
 1990 VICTOR HARBOUR FC
 1991 VICTOR HARBOUR FC
 1992 VICTOR HARBOUR FC
 1993 VICTOR HARBOUR FC
 1994 VICTOR HARBOUR FC
 1995 VICTOR HARBOUR FC
 1996 ENCOUNTER BAY FC
 1997 VICTOR HARBOUR FC
 1998 WILLUNGA FC
 1999 VICTOR HARBOUR FC
 2000 STRATHALBYN FC
 2001 LANGHORNE CREEK FC
 2002 LANGHORNE CREEK FC
 2003 MCLAREN FC
 2004 WILLUNGA FC
 2005 WILLUNGA FC
 2006 WILLUNGA FC
 2007 WILLUNGA FC

 2008 WILLUNGA FC
 2009 WILLUNGA FC
 2010 STRATHALBYN FC
 2011 LANGHORNE CREEK FC
 2012 LANGHORNE CREEK FC
 2013 ENCOUNTER BAY FC
 2014 STRATHALBYN FC
 2015 ENCOUNTER BAY FC
 2016 MOUNT COMPASS FC
 2017 MOUNT COMPASS FC
 2018 LANGHORNE CREEK FC
 2019 LANGHORNE CREEK FC
 2020 LANGHORNE CREEK FC
 2021 WILLUNGA FC
 2022 MCLAREN FC

Mail Medal

The Mail Medal has been awarded since 1933.   The Ozone Medal was awarded from 1925-32.

Ladders

2010 Ladder

2011 Ladder

2012 Ladder

2013 Ladder

2014 Ladder

2015 Ladder

2016 Ladder

2017 Ladder

2018 Ladder

References

External links
 Official website
 Footypedia – GSFL
 country footy
 Full Points Footy

Books
 Encyclopedia of South Australian country football clubs / compiled by Peter Lines. 
 South Australian country football digest / by Peter Lines 

Australian rules football competitions in South Australia